The BLH RT-624 was a twin-engined diesel-electric locomotive, built by Baldwin-Lima-Hamilton Corporation between August 1951 and February 1954.

The RT-624, an improved version of the former Baldwin DT-6-6-2000, was a center-cab transfer locomotive.
Twenty-four locomotives were built using 6-cylinder turbocharged 606A prime movers during 1951–1954. Penn Central operated ex-PRR #8955, and was retired in October 1969, and scrapped in July 1970.

No examples of the RT-624 are known to survive.

Original buyers

References

See also
 Lima LT-2500, a similar center-cab style transfer unit.

Diesel-electric locomotives of the United States
RT-624
C-C locomotives
Pennsylvania Railroad locomotives
Railway locomotives introduced in 1951
Scrapped locomotives
Standard gauge locomotives of the United States